Porcellio laevis (commonly called the swift woodlouse, dairy cow isopod, or smooth slater in Australia) is a species of woodlouse in the genus Porcellio. As the species epithet laevis as well as the vernacular name "swift woodlouse" suggests, the species is capable of quick bursts of speed when provoked.

This species of woodlice is distinctively large, appearing up to 20mm long with a smooth dorsal surface. The males can be identified by their long, spear-shaped uropods. Porcellio laevis has a smooth dorsal surface, which separates its visually from many other species of the Porcellio genus.

It is commonly kept as a pet due to its somewhat easy care requirements and the variety of color morphs available. The species is easy to keep and can be easily established in a terrarium within a few weeks. "Dairy cow isopod" is a commonly used name for a readily available piebald strain of the species.

Distribution and Habitat 
P. laevis was first recorded in Britain in the 13th century but it likely originated in North Africa. It has a cosmopolitan distribution, and has been introduced to Australia, including Norfolk Island and Lord Howe Island. The species is also found in North and South America, Western Asia, Japan, Australia and some Pacific islands.

This species is found under rocks and fallen logs in damp areas, and is otherwise rarely encountered. Records from Ireland and Britain also place them in agricultural areas like gardens, farms, and stables where they can be found in dung and compost piles.

Development and Maternal Care 
Porcellio laevis directly develop from yolky eggs. Both the eggs and juveniles develop within a brood pouch called a marsupium until the first juvenile stage. The use of the marsupium eliminates the need for there to be an external water source for early development since it is filled with fluid from the mother isopod. This is considered some of the most extensive parental care among terrestrial arthropods.

Ecological Significance 
Porcellio laevis plays an important role in nutrient cycling in habitats by breaking down dead plant material and animal waste, and thereby releasing essential nutrients back into the ecosystem. The species is known to be an opportunistic feeder, consuming a wide range of organic matter such as leaves, moss, lichens, and even rotting wood. Therefore, P. laevis can thrive in many different ecological niches. It is also an important food source for many animals, including birds, reptiles, and small mammals. There have been studies that have shown that P. laevis have the ability to tolerate and even accumulate heavy metals in their bodies. This makes them potential candidates for bioremediation of heavy metal-contaminated soils. Bioremediation is the use of living organisms to remove pollutants from the environment. In the case of P. laevis, they can be used to help move concentrated heavy metals out of contaminated soils, preventing them from remaining in one place and causing harm to other organisms. The ability for P. laevis to tolerate heavy metals can also make it an interesting model organism for studying adaptation and speciation. Its tolerance to heavy metals can be evolutionary response to the presence of heavy metals in its natural environment.

Behavior 
Porcellio laevis is one several species of Isopods known to use 'alternating turns' as a defense mechanism, running in a maze like pattern to confuse or avoid perceived threats. Also observed in Armadillidium vulgare, studies suggest that longer and more frequent exposure to predators causes this species of Isopod to engage in more 'alternating turns' as a learned response.

Polymorphism 
Porcellio laevis is known to exhibit polymorphism. Sometimes referenced to informally as "morphs", multiple polymorphic traits have been line-bred or isolated to product colonies of Porcellio laevis that can vary widely in color and pattern.

See also
List of woodlice of the British Isles

References

Porcellionidae
Crustaceans described in 1804